WEND (106.5 FM) – branded 106.5 The End – is a commercial alternative rock radio station licensed to Salisbury, North Carolina, serving primarily the Charlotte metropolitan area, as well as parts of the Piedmont Triad.  Owned by iHeartMedia, WEND is the local affiliate for Skratch 'N Sniff and the home of radio personalities, the Woody & Wilcox Show, Chris Rozak, and Divakar. The WEND studios are located in Charlotte, while the station transmitter resides in China Grove.  Besides a standard analog transmission, WEND broadcasts over two HD Radio channels, and is available online via iHeartRadio.

History
WEND began broadcasting on March 16, 1946 under the callsign WSTP-FM.  It became WRDX in 1970 and began airing its own programming. Pat Heiss was the morning host.

Doug Rice (now Speedway Motorsports radio play-by-play announcer) joined WSTP and WRDX in 1977, working a variety of on-air jobs and eventually becoming morning host and program director. He also served as play-by-play announcer for Catawba College football for nearly a decade, and color analyst for Howard Platt for Catawba basketball, and he called the Rowan County high school football game of the week on WRDX.

WRDX was playing country music prior to a signal increase in 1987 that allowed the station to cover both Charlotte and the Triad. At that time the station switched to satellite adult contemporary. Late in the 1980s, the station began playing more oldies, especially from the category of beach music.

Dalton Group, owner of WWMG in Charlotte, bought WRDX and WSTP for $3 million in 1995 and began operating the stations under a local marketing agreement. In May, WRDX changed its call letters to WEND, adopted its current format, with artists such as Pearl Jam and Nirvana and moved its studios to Charlotte.  This triggered numerous letters of protest in the Salisbury Post.

WEND's transmitter is located further north than most of the other major Charlotte stations.  It only provides a grade B signal to Rock Hill and most of the South Carolina portion of the Charlotte market.  This is because it is short-spaced to WTCB in Columbia at nearby 106.7.  Additionally, its transmitter is located as close as it can legally get to Charlotte while remaining close enough to its city of license, Salisbury, to provide a city-grade signal. At the same time, it provides at least secondary coverage to much of the Triad, and can even be heard as far as Burlington under the right conditions.

WEND was the local affiliate of the syndicated Bob and Tom Show until March 31, 2010.

Woody & Wilcox, from KBFX in Anchorage, Alaska, moved their morning show to Charlotte on April 19, 2010, though they continued to air on KBFX. The audience for mornings jumped 74 percent. On February 24, 2014, co-owned WVBZ in Greensboro, North Carolina became the first station other than WEND and KBFX to add the team. During 2014, Woody & Wilcox added three other affiliates: KKZX in Spokane, Washington; KKED in Fairbanks, Alaska on September 29; and KPAW in Fort Collins, Colorado.

WEND has aired weekend specialty shows Resurrection Sunday and 90 Minutes since 1995.  "90 Minutes" hosted by Divakar features local and independent artists & "Resurrection Sunday" featuring the roots of alternative rock which is  hosted by 'The Wizard'.

WEND airs Skratch 'N Sniff, a music program syndicated via Compass Media Networks, on Saturday nights.

Around 2013, alternative rock moved in a different direction, and WEND has added such artists as Twenty One Pilots, Blink-182 and Cold War Kids.

In October 2015, it was announced that iHeartMedia had acquired local rights to the Motor Racing Network and Performance Racing Network's coverage of the NASCAR Sprint Cup Series under a 2-year deal, with races to air on WEND. Representatives of the two networks were positive over the new deal, as WEND provides better over-the-air coverage of North Carolina than previous rightsholder WRHM.

In August 2017, Chuck "DZL" Thompson replaced Jack Daniel at WEND, becoming that station's second program director in 22 years.

References

External links
 Official website

1946 establishments in North Carolina
IHeartMedia radio stations
Modern rock radio stations in the United States
END
Radio stations established in 1946